Cuthbert Ross Cuthbert (6 February 1892 — 19 January 1971) was a Canada-born British ice hockey player who competed in the 1924 Winter Olympics and 1928 Winter Olympics.

Cuthbert was born in Calgary, Alberta. He travelled to Britain as part of the Canadian Expeditionary Force and saw service in France during the First World War.

At the 1924 Winter Olympics in Chamonix he was a member of the British ice hockey team which won the bronze medal. He then appeared at the 1926 Ice Hockey European Championship and, two years later, finished fourth with the British team in the 1928 Olympic tournament in St Moritz.

At the club level, Cuthbert initially played for Princes Ice Hockey Club, and later joined the United Services club.

Cuthbert rose to the rank of lieutenant colonel in the British Army, but retired from his military career in 1931 and travelled to America where he married the Chicago soap heiress Beatrice Kirk in 1934. This marriage ended in divorce. He married again in 1964, at the age of 72, to the American fashion designer Jane Derby. She died the following year. Cuthbert spent his retirement in Bermuda where he died in 1970.

References

External links
 

1892 births
1971 deaths
Canadian ice hockey players
Canadian people of Scottish descent
Ice hockey players at the 1924 Winter Olympics
Ice hockey players at the 1928 Winter Olympics
Medalists at the 1924 Winter Olympics
Olympic bronze medallists for Great Britain
Olympic ice hockey players of Great Britain
Olympic medalists in ice hockey
Ice hockey people from Calgary